Laure may refer to:

 Laure (film), a 1976 Italian erotic film in the Emmanuelle universe
 Doxocopa laure, commonly known as the Laure, a butterfly

People
 Laura (given name) (French variant)
 Laure (art model) (fl. 1859–1867), French model for Édouard Manet
 Laure (Nepalese rapper), Aashish Rana (born 1989), Nepalese rapper and actor
 Laure (footballer) (born 1985) or Laure, Spanish football player
 Colette Peignot (1903–1938), pen name Laure, French author

See also
 
 Lauer (disambiguation)
 Laur (surname)
 Laura (disambiguation)
 Laurel (disambiguation)
 Lauren (disambiguation)
 Laurer
 Lauret (disambiguation)
 Laurey (disambiguation)
 Laurie (disambiguation)